Try Not to Breathe is a 2006 Azerbaijani short film directed by Alina Abdullayeva.

In 2007 the film took part at the Clermont-Ferrand International Short Film Festival. In 2008 the film participated at the Salento Finibus Terrae International Short Film Festival where the film's director Alina Abdullayeva won an award for Best Director.

Cast
 Fakhraddin Manafov
 Dilara Kazimova

Plot
A few minutes in the life of two people: a young woman (Dilara Kazimova) who has her whole life in front of her and an old man (Fakhraddin Manafov) ill with asthma who has only one more night to live.

Awards
 2004 - Grant for Alina Abdullayeva for the short film project “Try not to breathe” awarded by AVANTI training programme (implemented by FOCAL, funded by SDC)
 2006 - Award for “Best debut” of National film academy"Golden lamp" (Baku, Azerbaijan)
 2006 - Award for “Best producer” at International Audio Visual Film Festival (Baku, Azerbaijan)
 2008 - Award for Best director at Salento Finibus Terrae International Short Film Festival (Italy)

References

External links
 Chalish nefes alma //www.clermont-filmfest.com.

2006 films
2006 short films
Azerbaijani short films
Azerbaijani drama films
Swiss short films
2000s Russian-language films
2006 drama films
Swiss drama films